Ricardo Zuloaga (1867-1932) was a Venezuelan engineer, businessman and philanthropist.

Early life
Ricardo Zuloaga was born on September 22, 1867 in Caracas, Venezuela.  He graduated from the Central University of Venezuela, where he studied engineering.

Career
Zuloaga was the founder and CEO of Electricidad de Caracas.

Death
Zuloaga died on December 15, 1932 in Caracas, Venezuela.

References

1867 births
1932 deaths
People from Caracas
Central University of Venezuela alumni
Venezuelan company founders
Venezuelan chief executives
Venezuelan philanthropists